Uma is a given name in various cultures.

In India, it is the name of the Hindu goddess, who is more commonly known as Parvati. In Sanskrit the word  can further mean "tranquillity", "splendour", "fame" and "night".

People with the name
 Uma (actress) (Uma Shankari, fl from 2000), Indian actress
 Uma Bharti (born 1959), Indian politician
 Uma Chowdhry (born 1957), American chemist
 Uma Devi Khatri (1923–2003), or Tun Tun, Indian actor and comedienne
 Uma Khouny, Israeli-Filipino contestant in Pinoy Big Brother
 Uma Krishnaswami (born 1956), Indian author
 Uma Narayan (fl. from 1990), Indian Scholar
 Uma Pemmaraju (1958–2022), Indian–American news anchor
 Uma Sharma (born 1942), kathak dancer and choreographer
 Uma Thurman (born 1970), American actress

Fictional characters with the name
 Uma, a main character in Oobi
 Uma, a main villain in Disney's Descendants 2 and Descendants 3

See also
 Uma (disambiguation)
 Una (disambiguation)
 Oona, given name
 Oonagh, given name
 Hunna, French saint

References

Indian feminine given names
Nepalese given names
Hebrew masculine given names